Chow Chee Keong (26 November 1948 – 21 February 2018) was a Malaysian football goalkeeper who played in Hong Kong.

Career
His nickname in Hong Kong was Asian Steel Gate and Crazy Sword. He was a Malaysian Chinese. In 1963, he represented the Malaysian in under-20 level as a 13-year-old. Two years later, he joined the Malaysian national football team as a 15-year-old. At that point, he was the youngest ever Malaysian international player. He was on the playing staff at Bedford Town FC 1967/68. From 1966 to 1970, he was voted by the Asian Football Confederation as the best goalkeeper for 5 straight times.

In 1968, he came to Hong Kong with a Chinese Malaysian selection side and many Hong Kong clubs took notice of him. Two years later, he joined Hong Kong Rangers for three guest matches. Then, he joined Jardine for a salary of HK$2,500 per month which was the Hong Kong record at that time. However, a year later, Jardines withdrew from the Hong Kong football league system. So he moved to South China where his career started to take off. For his three seasons with South China, he won many trophies and personal awards. In 1974, he moved to Tung Sing. His salary was HKD 7000 per month plus housing. In 1977, he returned to South China. A year later, he started to play in both Hong Kong league and the Malaysian league simultaneously. In 1979, he left Hong Kong, but returned in 1981. He spent a short time again with South China before moving to Hong Kong Rangers. In 1982, he finally returned to Malaysia and played for Malaysian national football team for three years before retiring from football.

Retirement
He became a golfer after retiring from football. In 1991, he finally earned a coaching license. He first started to teach in Malaysia. In 1995, he moved to a golf club in Shenzhen, China. In 1997, he returned to South China as a golfing instructor.

Honours

Club 
South China
 Hong Kong First Division:
Winners(3): 1971-72,  1973-74, 1977-78
 Hong Kong Senior Shield
Winners(1): 1971-72
 Viceroy Cup
Winners(1): 1971-72

International 
Malaysia
 Pestabola Merdeka
Winners(1): 1968

Individual 
AFC Asia's best goalkeeper: 1966, 1967, 1968, 1969, 1970
AFC Asian All Stars: 1968
Between The Sticks-Top 10 Asian & Oceanic goalkeepers of all time (5th place): 2020
IFFHS Men Best Malaysian Goalkeeper of the Century (1901-2000)
IFFHS Men’s All Time Malaysia Dream Team: 2022

References

1948 births
2018 deaths
South China AA players
Hong Kong Rangers FC players
Hong Kong First Division League players
Malaysian expatriate footballers
Malaysian sportspeople of Chinese descent
Malaysian footballers
Malaysia international footballers
Selangor FA players
Southeast Asian Games medalists in football
Southeast Asian Games bronze medalists for Malaysia
Association football goalkeepers
Competitors at the 1969 Southeast Asian Peninsular Games